Roger East may refer to:

 Roger East (journalist)  (1922–1975), Australian journalist
 Roger East (referee) (born 1965), English professional football referee 
 Roger East, pseudonym of Roger Burford (1904–1981)